Estany de la Pradella is a lake in Pyrénées-Orientales, Pyrénées, France. At an elevation of 1950 m, its surface area is 0.1 km².

Pradella